Power Plant is the sixth full-length album from the German power metal band, Gamma Ray. The album was initially released in 1999, but was re-released along with most of the band's past catalogue in 2002 with bonus tracks and new covers. This album has a tight focus on the power metal genre.

Most notably for the band, it was the first album in which the lineup from one album to the next remain unchanged, with Kai Hansen on vocals and guitar, Henjo Richter on guitar, Dirk Schlächter on bass and Dan Zimmermann on drums.

The cover painting and illustrations are by Derek Riggs, creator of Iron Maiden's Eddie mascot.

Track listing

"A While in Dreamland" also appears on the Silent Miracles EP.
"Rich and Famous" also appears on the Japanese version of Blast from the Past.

Personnel
Gamma Ray
Kai Hansen – vocals, guitars, producer, engineer, mixing
Henjo Richter – guitars, keyboards, artwork and booklet design
Dirk Schlächter – bass, producer, engineer, mixing
Dan Zimmermann – drums

Additional musicians
Piet Sielck – additional chorus on "Hand of Fate"

Production
Ralf Lindner – mastering at .Ham. Audio, Hamburg

Charts

References

1999 albums
Gamma Ray (band) albums
Albums produced by Kai Hansen
Noise Records albums